The Institut der Wirtschaftsprüfer in Deutschland e.V. (Institute of Public Auditors in Germany, Incorporated Association - IDW) is a privately run organisation based in Düsseldorf established to serve its members who comprise both individual Wirtschaftsprüfers (German Public Auditors) and Wirtschaftsprüfungsgesellschaften (German Public Audit firms). The IDW was established on a voluntary basis rather than having been established under German law. In accordance with its Articles of Incorporation, the IDW does not operate as a commercial business and is a not-for-profit organisation. Membership  was 12,979 full members, of whom 11,959 were German public auditors (87% of all German public auditors) and 1,020 were German public audit firms.

Mission
In accordance with its by-laws, the organisation fosters the technical domain of the public auditor and represents the interests of the profession. The IDW does this both nationally and internationally through collaboration within the various committees, and with permanent and ad-hoc IDW working parties in cooperation with technical staff at the headquarters in Düsseldorf.

The organisation:
 Represents the professional interests of its members at national and international levels;
 Undertakes technical work relevant to the fields in which its members are active;
 Provides training courses and support for trainee public auditors and continuing professional development for qualified public auditors;
 Provides support to members on technical issues in their day-to-day work.

Technical work
The IDW's technical work is mainly apparent in:
 statements in the form of expert opinions, IDW auditing standards and IDW opinions on accounting, IDW standards, information and working aids;
 comments on draft statutes, regulations, position papers and technical standards at both national and international levels;
 expert opinions provided in response to members' questions involving accounting and auditing and advice on taxation and management.

The IDW also provides:
 membership of committees in various organisations, among them the Fédération des Experts Comptables Européens (FEE) and the International Federation of Accountants (IFAC);
 political contacts on issues affecting the profession through IDW offices in Berlin and Brussels
 representation of the profession to the press and the public.

References

External links 
 Institute of Public Auditors in Germany, Incorporated Association - IDW 

Accounting organizations
Auditing organizations
Non-profit organisations based in North Rhine-Westphalia
Member bodies of the International Federation of Accountants